Hubert Annibaffa (born 1 November 1951) is a Saint Lucian cricketer. He played in twelve first-class and five List A matches for the Windward Islands from 1974 to 1982.

See also
 List of Windward Islands first-class cricketers

References

External links
 

1951 births
Living people
Saint Lucian cricketers
Windward Islands cricketers